

Studyhall is an online education startup based in Washington, DC, United States, and founded by Cornell and Washington University in St. Louis School of Law graduate Ross Blankenship in 2012.  The company is a peer-to-peer learning platform that seeks to change higher education by providing a virtual space in which students can collaborate.

Studyhall is active at Arizona State University, Columbia University, Cornell University, Georgetown University, Harvard University, Massachusetts Institute of Technology, Stanford University, University of California – Berkeley, University of California – Davis, University of California – Los Angeles, and Washington University in St. Louis.

Features 
Students create Studyhall.com accounts by providing the platform with their .edu email addresses. Studyhall members add their classes to their profile each semester, and are connected to other students in the same courses.  Other student groups are also able to communicate with Studyhall.com’s group forum pages. Students are notified of other members’ activity on the website through updates on their account homepage.

Studyhall.com accounts have a word processing feature for members to record, share, and organize class notes. Each accounts has video-chat capability for interactive study sessions, in which notes can be shared between two members on a collaborative “whiteboard.”

History 
Studyhall.com officially launched in September 2012 at the TechCrunch Disrupt conference in San Francisco, where the company was a Startup Battlefield Finalist.

References

External links 
 

American educational websites
Educational technology companies of the United States